The 1946 Cleveland Browns season was the team's first in the All-America Football Conference (AAFC). The Browns, coached by Paul Brown, ended the year with a record of 12–2, winning the AAFC's Western Division. Led by quarterback Otto Graham, fullback Marion Motley and ends Dante Lavelli and Mac Speedie, the team won the first AAFC championship game against the New York Yankees.

The Browns were founded by Arthur B. McBride, a Cleveland taxi-cab tycoon, as a charter franchise in the new AAFC. McBride in 1945 hired Brown, a successful coach at the high school and college levels. Brown, who was serving in the U.S. Navy during World War II, began to assemble a roster as the team prepared to begin play in 1946. After beating the Brooklyn Dodgers in an exhibition game, Cleveland opened the regular season against the Miami Seahawks at Cleveland Stadium on September 6, winning 44–0. The Browns proceeded to win six more games before losing for the first time in October against the San Francisco 49ers at home by a score of 34–20. Cleveland lost a second game in a row against the Los Angeles Dons the following week, but rebounded to win the final five games of the season, including a 66–14 victory over the Dodgers. Cleveland finished with the league's best record and a spot in the championship game against the Yankees. The Browns won the game 14–9.

Lavelli led the AAFC in receiving with 843 yards and 8 touchdowns, while placekicker Lou Groza led the league in points scored, with 84. Graham had the league's best passing average, with 10.5 yards per attempt. His quarterback rating of 112.1 was the highest in professional football history until Joe Montana surpassed it in 1989. Cleveland played all of its home games in Cleveland Stadium.

Founding of the Browns in the AAFC

In 1944 Arch Ward, the influential sports editor of the Chicago Tribune, started a new professional football league called the All-America Football Conference (AAFC). Ward, who had gained fame for starting all-star games for baseball and college football, lined up deep-pocketed owners including Arthur B. "Mickey" McBride, a Cleveland businessman who grew up in Chicago and knew Ward from his involvement in the newspaper business.

McBride developed a passion for football attending games at Notre Dame, where his son went to college. In the early 1940s he tried to buy the NFL's Cleveland Rams, owned by millionaire supermarket heir Dan Reeves, but was rebuffed. Having been awarded the Cleveland franchise in the AAFC, McBride asked Cleveland Plain Dealer sportswriter John Dietrich for head coaching suggestions. Dietrich recommended Paul Brown, the 36-year-old Ohio State Buckeyes coach. After consulting with Ward, McBride followed Dietrich's advice in early 1945, naming Brown head coach and giving him an ownership stake in the team and full control over player personnel. Brown, who had built an impressive record as coach of a Massillon, Ohio, high school team and brought the Buckeyes their first national championship, at the time was serving in the U.S. Navy and coached the football team at Great Lakes Naval Station near Chicago.

The name of the team was at first left up to Brown, who rejected calls for it to be christened the Browns. McBride then held a contest to name the team in May 1945; "Cleveland Panthers" was the most popular choice, but Brown rejected it because it was the name of an earlier failed football team. "That old Panthers team failed," Brown said. "I want no part of that name." In August, McBride gave in to popular demand and named the team the Browns, despite Paul Brown's objections.

Building a roster

As the war wound down with Germany's surrender in May 1945, the team parlayed Brown's ties to college football and the military to build its roster. The first signing was Otto Graham, a former star quarterback at Northwestern University who was then serving in the Navy. The Browns later signed kicker and offensive tackle Lou Groza and wide receivers Dante Lavelli and Mac Speedie. Fullback Marion Motley and nose tackle Bill Willis, two of the earliest African-Americans to play professional football, also joined the team in 1946. Cleveland's first training camp took place at Bowling Green University in northwestern Ohio. Brown's reputation for winning notwithstanding, joining the team was a risk; the Browns and the AAFC were nascent entities and faced tough competition from the NFL. "I just went up there to see what would happen," center Frank Gatski said many years later.

Almost all of the players Brown signed were war veterans. Gatski hitchhiked to Bowling Green from West Virginia in a military uniform. Once at training camp, the players faced intense competition for spots on the final roster. Rookies who had their college careers cut short by the war faced off against veteran players from NFL teams including the Chicago Cardinals and Chicago Bears. "It was a tough, dog-eat-dog situation, and you really had to hustle," Groza said later. Almost all of the men Brown signed had played for or against his teams at Ohio State and Great Lakes.

Five former Rams players also jumped to the Browns in 1946: center Mike Scarry, tackle Chet Adams and backs Gaylon Smith, Tommy Colella and Don Greenwood. Their move gave rise to a legal battle with the Rams, who had left Cleveland for Los Angeles shortly after winning the 1945 NFL Championship when Reeves, the Rams' owner, realized he had no prospect of competing with the Browns. 

Reeves subsequently filed an injunction against Adams in federal court after he signed with the Browns, claiming the tackle had unlawfully broken his contract to play for the Rams. Adams argued he had no obligation under his contract to play for the Rams, as the team were now the Los Angeles Rams following their relocation. 

At the end of August 1946, federal judge Emerich Freed denied the Rams' injunction, allowing Adams to play for the Browns. Judge Freed rejected the Rams' contention that Adams had signed a contract to play for Reeves, not a specific team, and also ruled that the Cleveland Rams (by extension, Adams' contract) had ceased to exist.

In addition to the players, Brown hired a number of assistant coaches. John Brickels, an Ohio native, was brought in early on to sign players while Brown was still in the Navy. He later served as a backfield coach. Another hire was Blanton Collier, a high school coach for 16 years who had been an assistant to Brown at Great Lakes:  Collier would succeed Brown in 1963 as the team's head coach. Fritz Heisler was brought in as a guard coach, and he stayed with the Browns until the 1970s.

Roster and coaching staff

Preseason

Source: Cleveland Plain Dealer
 
 
 
 
 
 
 
 

The Browns' first and only preseason game took place at the Rubber Bowl in Akron, Ohio, against the Brooklyn Dodgers. Cleveland won the game 35–20. Brooklyn opened the scoring with a touchdown in the first quarter and another on the first play of the second quarter. Both touchdowns followed interceptions thrown by Otto Graham. Substituting for Graham, Cliff Lewis threw a short touchdown pass to Fred Evans near the end of the second quarter to give the Browns their first points. Cleveland scored again in the second half after John Rokisky picked up a fumble by Brooklyn halfback Glenn Dobbs and ran it 55 yards for a touchdown, giving the Browns the lead. Graham threw a short pass to Mac Speedie for another touchdown in the third quarter, and added a 20-yard pass to George Young in the fourth quarter to widen the lead. In the same quarter, Evans intercepted a Dobbs pass and ran 83 yards for his second touchdown. Brooklyn had a touchdown near the end of the game to make the final score 35–20. Cleveland won the game despite trailing the Dodgers in rushing yards, 93 to 63. After the win, the Browns prepared to face the Miami Seahawks in their first regular-season game the following Friday.

Schedule

Note: Intra-division opponents are in bold text.

Game summaries

Week 1: vs. Miami Seahawks

Source: Pro Football Reference
 
 
 
 
 
 
 
 

The Browns' first game, against the Miami Seahawks, took place on a warm late-summer evening in September. The crowd was the second-largest ever for a professional football game. The game was well-attended in part because of team owner Arthur B. McBride's promotion of the new team, but also because the Browns' two black players helped draw a large African-American crowd. Miami's team, drawn mainly from the Southern United States, was overmatched by Cleveland. The score was 27–0 at halftime and the final was 44–0. Browns end Mac Speedie scored the team's first points on a 19-yard touchdown pass from quarterback Cliff Lewis. Otto Graham came in at quarterback in the second quarter and threw a touchdown to Dante Lavelli. Placekicker Lou Groza kicked three field goals, and the Browns had two defensive touchdowns. Miami never advanced past the Browns' 39-yard line.

Week 2: vs. Chicago Rockets

Source: Pro Football Reference
 
 
 
 
 

In their second game, the Browns faced the Chicago Rockets at Soldier Field before a crowd of 51,962 people, an attendance record for a professional football game in Chicago. It was the first of many games during which Cleveland's two black players, Marion Motley and Bill Willis, endured racially charged verbal and physical abuse. Some of their white teammates, including Lou Rymkus, retaliated by dealing their own cheap shots. Motley opened the scoring with a 20-yard run for a touchdown, the first in his career. Lou Groza added two field goals in the third quarter, and halfback Don Greenwood ran for a 41-yard touchdown to make the final score 20–6. Chicago's only points came on a touchdown run by Billy Hillenbrand on the first play of the fourth quarter. Motley later said that racism on the field stopped after opponents saw how well he and Willis played: "They found out that while they were calling us niggers and alligator bait, I was running for touchdowns and Willis was knocking the shit out of them. So they stopped calling us names and started trying to catch up with us."

Week 3: vs. Buffalo Bisons

Source: Pro Football Reference
 
 
 
 

The Browns next played the Buffalo Bisons in Buffalo, New York. Just over 30,000 people watched the game; while this was a lower total than the Browns' previous two games, it set a professional football attendance record in Buffalo. Playing in 80-degree heat, Browns quarterback Otto Graham threw two touchdowns in the first quarter to John Yonakor and Marion Motley. Cleveland scored for a third time in the first quarter when Cliff Lewis, substituting for Graham, pitched a lateral to Gaylon Smith, who ran it in for a touchdown. After neither team scored in the second and third quarters, the Browns added a fourth touchdown on Chet Adams' fumble return. Al Dekdebrun, Buffalo's second-string quarterback, fumbled at the Bisons' 34-yard line and Adams picked it up and ran for a touchdown. The Bisons were held scoreless despite having more first downs than the Browns. The team played without its primary rushing threat, Steve Juzwik, who was sidelined with a pulled leg muscle.

Week 4: vs. New York Yankees

Source: Pro Football Reference
 
 
 
 
 

Cleveland got off to a strong start against the New York Yankees, scoring two touchdowns in the first nine minutes. Interceptions by Don Greenwood and center Mike Scarry set up the scores. The Yankees came back with a touchdown of their own later in the first quarter after recovering a Graham fumble at Cleveland's 14-yard line. Neither team scored in the second and third quarters, but the Browns added to their lead in the fourth. Lou Groza kicked a field goal and Edgar "Special Delivery" Jones ran up the middle for a 43-yard touchdown with less than three minutes left in the game. The final score was 24–7; it was the Yankees' first loss of the season and left the Browns as the only unbeaten and untied team in the AAFC. After the game, Yankees coach Ray Flaherty criticized his team for losing to a "Podunk team with a high school coach". The threat of bad weather kept attendance down, but the gross ticket receipts of $138,673 still marked the third-best take for a professional football game in history.

Week 5: vs. Brooklyn Dodgers

Source: Pro Football Reference
 
 
 
 
 
 

The Browns won their fifth game in a row against the Brooklyn Dodgers, 26–7. Halfback Don Greenwood scored two touchdowns, one in the first quarter and another in the second. Tommy Colella added a third touchdown in the final quarter on a four-yard rush. Groza added a field goal and made all of his extra points, bringing his season scoring total to 38 and his string of consecutive extra points without a miss to 17. Edgar "Special Delivery" Jones intercepted a pass thrown by Dodgers quarterback Glenn Dobbs, and Lou Saban intercepted two more. Both of Saban's interceptions led to Browns scores. The Browns' defense held the Dodgers to just 37 yards of rushing. Bob Steuber, a Browns halfback, suffered a rib injury in the game and was expected to be out for two weeks.

Week 6: vs. New York Yankees

Source: Pro Football Reference
 

The Browns won their second matchup against the Yankees 7–0 amid a heavy downpour. The weather kept attendance to 34,252, but raised Cleveland's season attendance total over 300,000 people including its preseason game at the Akron Rubber Bowl. The only score of the game came in the third quarter, when quarterback Otto Graham passed to Dante Lavelli for a 33-yard touchdown. Cleveland won despite being outplayed by the Yankees statistically. The Yankees had 10 first downs to the Browns' five, and had 237 yards of total offense to just 67 yards for the Browns. Cleveland was held to just 24 yards of rushing, and Marion Motley, the team's star fullback, rushed for minus eight yards in six attempts. The Yankees threatened to tie the game at the end of the fourth quarter, driving to the Cleveland 16-yard line. New York's pass attempts failed, however, giving the Browns the victory. It was Cleveland's sixth win in a row.

Week 7: vs. Los Angeles Dons

Source: Pro Football Reference
 
 
 
 
 
 
 

The Browns next beat the Los Angeles Dons 31–14 in Cleveland to extend their winning streak to seven games. The crowd of 71,134 people who attended the game on a sunny October day was a professional football record. Cleveland got off to a slow start, falling behind 7–3 at halftime. The Browns' only score in the first half came on a 49-yard Lou Groza field goal, then the fourth-longest kick in professional football history. A flurry of scoring at the end of the third quarter and in the fourth quarter, however, won Cleveland the game. Otto Graham passed 36 yards to end Dante Lavelli and then ran in a touchdown with less than three minutes left in the third. It was the first of four touchdowns in 14 minutes of play. Fullback Marion Motley ran in two touchdowns in the fourth quarter, one of them a 68-yard run that tied an AAFC record for a rush from scrimmage. The Browns won despite a strong ground attack by the Dons, who gained 274 yards of rushing. The Dons had 21 first downs compared to Cleveland's 10. Groza made all of his extra point attempts, extending his streak to 22 in a row.

Week 8: vs. San Francisco 49ers

Source: Pro Football Reference
 
 
 
 
 
 
 
 
 

The Browns suffered their first defeat of the season at the hands of the San Francisco 49ers before a crowd of 70,385 in Cleveland. The 49ers led throughout the game, helped by three touchdown passes from left-handed quarterback Frankie Albert. Albert's main target was Alyn Beals, a former Santa Clara University star who caught two of his passes for touchdowns. Kicker Joe Vetrano added to the 49ers lead with a pair of field goals in the first half. Don Greenwood ran for a Browns touchdown in the second quarter, but the extra point was botched. The snap was high and went into kicker Lou Groza's arms. He tried to run with the ball but suffered a back injury when he was tackled short of the end zone. Cliff Lewis was also injured in the second quarter, twisting his knee badly. He was taken to a hospital. The Browns ran only 24 offensive plays in the first half, and the 49ers were ahead by 14 points by halftime. Despite losing 34–20, the Browns matched the 49ers statistically, with 338 total yards to San Francisco's 357. Marion Motley, who had been the AAFC's leading rusher before the game, was held to 22 yards.

Week 9: vs. Los Angeles Dons

Source: Pro Football Reference
 
 
 
 
 
 

Cleveland next lost its second straight game, against the Los Angeles Dons in Los Angeles. The Dons opened the scoring on the first play from scrimmage after the Browns kicked off. Chuck Fenenbock ran the ball 75 yards for a touchdown. Cleveland came back to build a 16–7 lead at halftime, but Groza missed his first extra point in 24 tries after Bill Lund ran for a touchdown in the second quarter. The missed extra point proved to be the difference in the game. Los Angeles went back on top in the fourth quarter with a Dale Gentry run for a touchdown and a field goal by Joe Aquirre with just 18 seconds left and won by one point, 17–16. A fumble by Browns halfback Ray Terrell at the Los Angeles 35-yard line in the fourth quarter gave the Dons the ball and led to Aquirre's game-winning field goal. Cleveland's running game stalled for the second game in a row; the team gained only 43 yards rushing. Bill Willis, the Browns' defensive star, sat out the entire game with a strep infection. Two other Browns players, Bob Steuber and Alex Kapter, suffered leg injuries and were helped off the field.

Week 10: vs. San Francisco 49ers

Source: Pro Football Reference
 
 
 

The Browns won their rematch with San Francisco 14–7 two weeks after losing to the 49ers at home. Cleveland rebounded from two poor rushing games. Runs by halfback Bill Lund and fullback Marion Motley set up touchdowns in the first half. Lund had a series of successful carries that set up the first touchdown in the first quarter, a short pass to Dante Lavelli from Otto Graham. Motley's 64-yard run in the second quarter was followed by a three-yard touchdown run by Gaylon Smith. Lund, however, turned his ankle in the first quarter and did not return to the game. Motley also suffered a pulled leg muscle in the second quarter and played sparingly thereafter. The 49ers came back in the fourth quarter with strong rushing from fullback Norm Standlee and Earle Parsons. Frankie Albert scored the team's lone touchdown on a one-yard run. San Francisco threatened to tie the game, reaching the Cleveland 19-yard line with five minutes to play, but the Browns defense stood firm and stopped the advance. The win put the Browns two games ahead of the 49ers in the AAFC's western conference with four games to play.

Week 11: vs. Chicago Rockets

Source: Pro Football Reference
 
 
 
 
 
 
 
 
 
 

Cleveland beat the Rockets 51–14 at home before a crowd of 60,457, the fourth time during the season that attendance at Cleveland Stadium surpassed 60,000 people. The Browns led from start to finish, and Lavelli and Speedie had two touchdown receptions each. Graham's four touchdown passes helped the Browns reach an AAFC scoring record. Bud Schwenk made his first appearance in the fourth quarter of the game, substituting for Graham as the game turned into a blowout. He threw for a fifth touchdown, a 20-yard pass to Bill Lund. Edgar Jones added to Cleveland's scoring with a touchdown run in the first quarter, and center Frank Gatski scored the team's final touchdown in the fourth quarter after intercepting a pass and running it back 36 yards. It was the only touchdown of Gatski's 12-year career. Groza made a 51-yard field goal, the longest of the year in either the National Football League or AAFC, and kicked through six of the team's seven extra points. The seventh extra point was blocked, only the second time he missed a conversion in 33 tries. The Rockets managed two touchdowns, the first by Elroy Hirsch on an 81-yard drive in the second quarter and the second on a 76-yard punt return in the third quarter.

Week 12: vs. Buffalo Bisons

Source: Pro Football Reference
 
 
 
 
 
 
 
 
 

Cleveland clinched first place in the AAFC's western division and earned a spot in the championship game by beating the Bisons 42–17. The Browns fell behind 10–7 in the first quarter, but subsequently scored 35 unanswered points. Edgar Jones scored two touchdowns, while Motley ran 76 yards for another score. Al Akins and Bud Schwenk had their only touchdowns of the season, playing in the fourth quarter after the Browns amassed a large lead. Despite the Browns' large margin of victory, the game was evenly matched; Cleveland's scores came mostly on breakaway plays. The Bisons had 19 first downs, nine more than the Browns, although the Browns out-gained the Bisons with 455 total yards. The game was marred by numerous penalties against both teams for unnecessary roughness, and the Bisons' kicker Lou Zontini and Browns halfback Ray Terrell were ejected after getting into a fight at midfield in the second quarter. A total of 37,054 people attended the game, the lowest figure for a Browns home game at that point in the season.

Week 13: vs. Miami Seahawks

Source: Pro Football Reference
 
 
 
 
 
 

Despite traveling without key players Marion Motley and Bill Willis because of Florida's segregation laws, Cleveland beat Miami in a shutout for the second time in the season, winning 34–0. Fueled by the ire the entire team felt because of leaving friends behind, Otto Graham opened the scoring with a 37-yard interception return for a touchdown and the Browns never looked back. Three other Browns players – Edgar Jones, Gaylon Smith and Gene Fekete – ran for touchdowns. Fekete's touchdown was the only one of his short professional career. Groza kicked two field goals, giving him 12 on the season and tying the all-time professional record set in 1926 by Paddy Driscoll. Cleveland led Miami in all phases of the game, amassing 159 yards rushing to Miami's eight and 233 yards of total offense. Miami gained a total of 46 yards rushing and passing. As the Browns prepared to face the Dodgers in the last game of the regular season, they looked ahead to a matchup in the AAFC championship in Cleveland on December 22 with the New York Yankees, the winners the eastern division.

Week 14: vs. Brooklyn Dodgers

Source: Pro Football Reference
 
 
 
 
 
 
 
 
 
 
 
 

The last game of the Browns' regular season was a 66–14 win over the Dodgers. Nine different Cleveland players scored touchdowns in the game. The Browns' point total set an AAFC scoring record. Groza kicked a field goal to reach 13 for the season, exceeding Driscoll's all-time record. He also kicked four extra points, bringing his total for the season to 45 and beating the previous professional record of 42. Groza, however, injured his left ankle in the third quarter while making a tackle and had to be carried off the field. Substituting for Groza, Chet Adams kicked through five more extra points. Otto Graham played less than half of the game as Cleveland built a large lead, and Cliff Lewis and Bud Schwenk substituted for him in the second half. The Browns ended the game with several injured players at key positions. In addition to Groza, halfbacks Ray Terrell, Don Greenwood and Al Akins had to sit out because of injuries. The win gave Cleveland a 12–2 record as they prepared to face the Yankees in the championship game.

Final standings

AAFC championship

A week before the championship game, three Browns players were arrested after a confrontation with Cleveland police. Team captain Jim Daniell, end Mac Speedie, tackle Lou Rymkus and halfback Edgar Jones were drinking and waiting for Speedie's wife to arrive on a flight from Utah. They dropped Jones off and came up behind a police car that was blocking their way. Daniell, who was driving the car, honked the horn, and an argument ensued that ended with the arrest of all three men. Daniell was booked on public intoxication, and Speedie and Rymkus were charged with creating a disturbance. Paul Brown fired Daniell after the incident, saying he had "a special obligation to be exemplary in his behavior" because he was the team captain.

Source: Pro Football Reference
 
 
 
 

The first-ever AAFC championship took place on December 22, 1946, at Cleveland Stadium before a crowd of 41,181. Temperatures were in the 30s, which contributed to the low attendance numbers compared to other Browns home games, but the championship game drew more people than all but three NFL championship games up to that point. The Yankees were in close competition with the Browns as the AAFC's leading team, and finished the season by winning seven of their last eight games. The Browns and Yankees had different styles of play: while the Browns used a T formation offense, the Yankees had a single-wing formation. New York's roster included Spec Sanders, who led the AAFC with 709 yards of rushing and 12 touchdowns.

The championship game was largely a defensive battle with little scoring from either team. New York scored the game's first points in the first quarter on a 21-yard field goal by Harvey Johnson, but the Browns went into the lead in the second quarter when Marion Motley ran for a touchdown after a 70-yard drive. The Yankees retook the lead in the third quarter, marching 80 yards down the field for a Sanders touchdown. Cleveland reached the New York 18-yard line at the end of the third, but the drive stalled and Lou Groza missed a short field goal, his third failed attempt of the game. Groza had suffered a sprained left ankle, and Chet Adams substituted for him. Adams, however, missed another field goal in the fourth quarter. The Browns took the lead again in the fourth quarter when Graham passed to Lavelli for a 16-yard touchdown. Groza came back in and kicked the extra point, giving Cleveland a 14–9 advantage with 4:31 to play in the game. Sanders returned the ensuing kickoff 35 yards, and the Yankees started the drive at the Browns' 45-yard line. The Yankees appeared poised for a comeback, but Graham intercepted a pass on a third down and Cleveland was almost able to run out the clock. Time expired after a Tommy Colella punt and one short Yankees completion.

Graham had 213 yards of passing in the championship game. Lavelli registered 87 receiving yards, and Speedie had 71. Motley was the team's leading rusher, with 98 yards on 13 carries. Cleveland's defense was able to hold Sanders and New York quarterback Ace Parker in check. Parker had only 81 yards of passing, and Sanders ran for just 55 yards.

Season leaders

Graham had an average of 10.5 yards per passing attempt, the second-most in history at the time. He had a passer rating of 112.1, setting a single-season record not exceeded until Joe Montana eclipsed it in 1989. Motley finished the season with 601 yards rushing, the fourth most in the AAFC. Edgar Jones was the league's fifth-most-prolific rusher, gaining 539 yards. Greenwood had six rushing touchdowns, tying for the league lead. Lavelli tied for first place in receptions, with 40, and led the league in receiving yards, with 843. His eight receiving touchdowns gave him second place in the league. Speedie, meanwhile, led all receivers in yards per reception, with 23.5. On defense, Colella led the AAFC with 10 interceptions; as a team, the Browns were the league's interception leaders by a large margin, with 41. The Browns had 67 total defensive takeaways, a professional football record that still stands. Groza scored the most field goals and extra points and set a professional football record for a kicker by scoring 84 points. He was the first-ever kicker to make two field goals from beyond 50 yards in a season. A number of Browns players were named to sportswriters' All-Pro teams, including Motley, Speedie, Lavelli, Willis and Mike Scarry.

References

Bibliography

External links 
 1946 Cleveland Browns at Pro-Football-Reference.com
 1946 Cleveland Browns Statistics at jt-sw.com
 1946 Cleveland Browns Schedule at jt-sw.com
 1946 Cleveland Browns at Database Football

Cleveland
Cleveland Browns seasons
Cleveland Browns